George William Mundelein (July 2, 1872 – October 2, 1939) was an American cardinal of the Roman Catholic Church. He served as Archbishop of Chicago from 1915 until his death, and was elevated to the cardinalate in 1924.

Early life and ministry

George Mundelein was born on the Lower East Side of Manhattan to Francis and Mary (née Goetz) Mundelein. One of three children, he had two sisters, Margaret and Anna. His father was of German descent, and his mother was Irish. His grandfather fought in the Civil War.

He attended La Salle Academy and Manhattan College, where he befriended Patrick Joseph Hayes (a future cardinal and Archbishop of New York). He graduated from Manhattan in 1889 with high honors. Mundelein also studied at St. Vincent Seminary in Latrobe, Pennsylvania, and the Pontifical Urbaniana University in Rome, where he was ordained to the priesthood by Bishop Charles Edward McDonnell on June 8, 1895.

Returning to the United States, he then did pastoral work in the Diocese of Brooklyn and served as secretary to Bishop McDonnell until 1897. From 1897 to 1909, he was chancellor for the diocese.

Bishop
On June 30, 1909, Mundelein was appointed Auxiliary Bishop of Brooklyn and Titular Bishop of Loryma by Pope Pius X. He received his episcopal consecration on the following September 21 from Bishop McDonnell, with Bishops Charles H. Colton and John O'Connor serving as co-consecrators, at St. James Cathedral-Basilica. At thirty-six, Mundelein was the youngest bishop in the country at that time.

Archbishop of Chicago
Mundelein was later named the third Archbishop of Chicago, Illinois, on December 9, 1915. He was formally installed as archbishop on February 9, 1916, and was appointed an assistant at the pontifical throne on May 8, 1920.

At a large dinner held at the University Club of Chicago on February 12, 1916, an anarchist chef, Jean Crones, slipped arsenic into the soup in an attempt to poison Mundelein and over 100 other guests, including Illinois Governor Edward F. Dunne.  The soup was watered down due to the arrival of about fifty extra guests.  None of the assembled guests died, as a hastily prepared emetic was supplied by a doctor, J. B. Murphy, who although mildly stricken himself, was able to help the other victims.  (Many vomited the poison out of their systems, though suffering considerable agony.)  Mundelein ate only a bite or two of the soup.  Newspapers referred to the mass-murder attempt as the "Mundelein poison soup plot".  Jean Crones was suspected at the time of being a German agent, but turned out to be an Italian anarchist named Nestor Dondoglio, a member of the Galleanist circle of anarchists who also included Sacco and Vanzetti.  Dondoglio allegedly wrote letters to American newspapers after the crime (many of these were hoaxes).  He was never apprehended, though police spent years taking men into custody thought to be "Jean Crones". Crones/Dondoglio died peacefully in Connecticut in 1932 "where he had found haven with friends".

The archdiocese greatly expanded its charity functions during the Great Depression, rivaling that of Chicago's Associated Jewish Charities. A citywide network of St. Vincent de Paul Societies was established.

Cardinal
Pope Pius XI created him Cardinal-Priest of Santa Maria del Popolo in the consistory of March 24, 1924. With his elevation, Chicago became the first diocese west of the Allegheny Mountains to have a cardinal. Several years later in 1926, he presided over the 28th International Eucharistic Congress, which was held in Chicago.

In 1933, he was appointed judge for the apostolic process for Mother Cabrini's cause for canonization.

Mundelein served as papal legate to the eighth National Eucharistic Congress in New Orleans, Louisiana, on September 13, 1938, and was one of the cardinal electors who participated in the 1939 papal conclave, which selected Pope Pius XII.

Death
Mundelein died from heart disease in his sleep in Mundelein, Illinois (a village renamed in his own honor 14 years prior to his death), at age 67. He is buried behind the main altar of the chapel at Mundelein Seminary, which was founded on his initiative.

Views

Church and politics
Considered a liberal, Mundelein was a friend of President Franklin D. Roosevelt and supporter of the New Deal.  A staunch supporter of trade unions, the Cardinal once remarked,

Film industry
Mundelein commented on the film industry in 1934, saying, "We don't like the Mae West type ... The kind of film in which Will Rogers, Janet Gaynor, and Victor Moore appear is what we have in mind."

Marriage
In 1935, he said "that not war, nor famine, nor pestilence have brought so much suffering and pain to the human race, as have hasty, ill-advised marriages, unions entered into without the knowledge, the preparation, the thought even an important commercial contract merits and receives. God made marriage an indissoluble contract, Christ made it a sacrament, the world today has made it a plaything of passion, an accompaniment of sex, a scrap of paper to be torn up at the whim of the participants." He was an outspoken opponent of contraception.

Ethnic groups
During his tenure in Chicago, Mundelein launched an effort to unify ethnic Catholic groups such as the Poles and Italians into territorial, instead of ethnic, parishes with mixed success. St. Monica's parish, however, was endorsed by Mundelein as the city's sole black parish, leading to distaste for the archbishop in both the early 1900s and today.  After constructing the landmark Archbishop Quigley Preparatory Seminary in Chicago, Mundelein built St. Mary of the Lake Seminary, later renamed Mundelein Seminary in his honor, in Area, now Mundelein, Illinois. Quigley Seminary was the site of Mundelein's 1937 "paper hanger" speech, criticizing Adolf Hitler. He also organized the construction of other churches in the see, such as the Saint Philip Neri church and the Corpus Christi Church, both designed by Chicago architect Joseph W. McCarthy.  He publicly sparred with the Father Charles Coughlin, the Detroit Catholic priest who broadcast anti banking and anti-Semitic views to millions of radio listeners until he was forced off the air in 1939.

See also
Mundelein College
Mundelein, Illinois
List of covers of Time magazine (1920s) – May 31, 1926

References

}

1872 births
1939 deaths
Saint Vincent College alumni
Pontifical Urban University alumni
20th-century American cardinals
Catholics from New York (state)
Catholics from Illinois
Roman Catholic archbishops of Chicago
American Roman Catholic clergy of Irish descent
American people of German descent
Manhattan College alumni
Clergy from New York City